The 2013 1. divisjon (referred to as Adeccoligaen for sponsorship reasons) was a Norwegian second-tier football league season. The season began on 7 April 2013 and was concluded on 3 November 2013. The league was contested by 16 teams. The top two teams were promoted to the Tippeligaen, while the teams placed from third to sixth place played a promotion-playoff against the 14th-placed team in Tippeligaen to win promotion. The bottom four teams were relegated to the 2. divisjon.

Background
From the 2012 1. divisjon, Start and Sarpsborg 08 won promotion to Tippeligaen, while Stabæk and Fredrikstad were relegated to the First Division.

Tromsdalen, Bærum, Notodden and Alta were relegated from the 2012 1. divisjon, while Elverum, Kristiansund, Vard Haugesund and Follo were promoted from the 2012 2. divisjon.

Summary
At the end of the season Bodø/Glimt and Stabæk won promotion to the 2014 Tippeligaen, while Vard Haugesund, Kongsvinger Elverum and Follo was relegated to the 2. divisjon.

Teams

League table

Top scorers

Source:

References

Norwegian First Division seasons
2
Norway
Norway